"All Around the World" is a 1955 hit song by Little Willie John written by Titus Turner. The song was the debut single and first hit for Little Willie John, and a hit in 1969 for Little Milton, renamed as "Grits Ain't Groceries". Milton's version reached No. 5 on the US Billboard R&B chart, and No. 73 on the Billboard Hot 100. James Booker also covered the song  on his album Classified, and Leigh Harris and Larry Sieberth covered it on the album Patchwork: A Tribute to James Booker. Edwin Starr recorded the track for his 1970 LP War & Peace on Motown Records. Lou Rawls also covered the song on for Blue Note Records, on his album It's Supposed to Be Fun, released January 1, 1990, which became a hit.

Lyrics 
The song is a profession of the singer's love for someone addressed as "my baby," describing what else wouldn't be true if he doesn't love his woman. Each verse ends with this refrain:
    Well, if I don't love you, baby
    Grits ain't groceries
    Eggs ain't poultry
    And Mona Lisa was a man.

See Also
All Around the World Lyrics

References

Little Willie John songs
1955 songs
Songs written by Titus Turner